This is a list of Belgian football transfers for the 2011 summer transfer window. Only transfers involving a team from the Jupiler League are listed.

The summer transfer window will open on 1 July 2011, although some transfers took place prior to that date. Players without a club may join one at any time, either during or in between transfer windows. The transfer window ends on 31 August 2011, although a few completed transfers could still  only be announced a few days later.

Sorted by date

September 2010

January 2011

February 2011

March 2011

April 2011

May 2011

End of 2010–11 season
After the end of the 2010–11 season, several players will return from loan to another club or will not have their contracts extended. These will be listed here when the date is otherwise not specified.

June 2011

July 2011

August 2011

September 2011

Sorted by team

AA Gent

In:

Out:

Anderlecht

In:

Out:

Beerschot
Note: until 17 May 2011, the club was officially known as Germinal Beerschot, but at that date the name was changed to Beerschot AC. 

In:

Out:

Cercle Brugge

In:

Out:

Club Brugge

In:

Out:

Kortrijk

In:

Out:

KV Mechelen

In:

Out:

Lierse

In:

Out:

Lokeren

In:

 

Out:

Mons

In:

Out:

OH Leuven

In:

Out:

Racing Genk

In:

Out:

Sint-Truiden

In:

Out:

Standard Liège

In:

Out:

Westerlo

In:

Out:

Zulte Waregem

In:

Out:

Footnotes

References

Belgian
Transfers Summer
2011 Summer